Money Talks is an album by the Memphis, Tennessee-based funk band The Bar-Kays.

Reception

Made up of tracks recorded for Stax Records before its 1975 collapse, Money Talks was released on Stax by its new owner, Fantasy Records, in October 1978 to capitalize on The Bar-Kays' newfound success at Mercury Records.  This album would chart at number twenty one on the Billboard Soul Album charts. The single "Holy Ghost" would chart at number nine on the Soul Singles Charts.

Track listing
"Holy Ghost"   	 3:56   	
"Feelin' Alright" 	4:56 	
"Monster" 	6:50 	
"Money Talks"    6:51 	
"Mean Mistreater" 	5:45 	
"Holy Ghost (Reborn)" 	6:01
NOTE: The most popular version of "Holy Ghost" was the 8:30 extended disco mix released on 12-inch single.

Charts

Singles

References

External links
 The Bar-Kays – Money Talks at Discogs

1978 albums
Bar-Kays albums
Stax Records albums